Igor Patenko (born 25 May 1969) is a Soviet former cyclist. He competed in the team time trial at the 1992 Summer Olympics for the Unified Team.

References

External links
 

1969 births
Living people
Kazakhstani male cyclists 
Soviet male cyclists
Olympic cyclists of the Unified Team
Cyclists at the 1992 Summer Olympics
People from Taraz